Arazi may refer to:

Places
Arazi Bahirchar Ghoshkati, village in Barisal District in the Barisal Division of southern-central Bangladesh 
Arazi Gobindapur, village in Jhalokati District in the Barisal Division of southern-central Bangladesh 
Arazi Kalikapur, village in Barisal District in the Barisal Division of southern-central Bangladesh
Arazi, Isfahan,  village in Isfahan Province, Iran
Arazi-ye Qaleh Now, village in Kerman Province, Iran
Arazi Masnali, town in the Islamabad Capital Territory of Pakistan
A medieval town Arazi, near Ray, Iran (Rhagae)

Other uses 
Arazi (horse)
 Arazi (surname)